A flutter valve (also known as the Heimlich valve after its inventor, Henry Heimlich) is a one-way valve used in respiratory medicine to prevent air from travelling back along a chest tube. One can also use a chest drainage management system, which typically enables vacuum to be applied along with quantifying the effluent.  However, it is much larger with more tubing, which may encumber the patient.  

It is most commonly used to help remove air from a pneumothorax. The valve is usually designed as a rubber sleeve within a plastic case where the rubber sleeve is arranged so that when air passes through the valve one way the sleeve opens and lets the air through. However, when air is sucked back the other way, the sleeve closes off and no air is allowed backwards. This construction enables it to act as a one-way valve allowing air (or fluid) to flow only one way along the drainage tube. The end of the drainage tube is placed inside the patient's chest cavity, within the air or fluid to be drained. The flutter valve is placed in the appropriate orientation (most packages are designed so the valve can only be connected in the appropriate orientation) and the pneumothorax is thus evacuated from the patient's chest.

There are several potential problems with these valves.  One is that the chest tube can clog. When chest tube clogging occurs, the pneumothorax or subcutaneous emphysema can recur. This can also lead to empyema.  The other is that these tend to leak fluid.  To address this, some have turned to small chest drainage alternatives. An alternative solution is to attach a sputum trap to the valve, thus providing a reservoir to capture the draining fluid.

The flutter valves or Pneumostat valves allow patients to ambulate more easily and patients may be able leave the hospital in certain instances. The traditional chest tube collection box often would require longer hospital stay.

References

External links 
bd_bardparker_heimlich_chest_drain_valve_brochure.pdf from BD Bard Parker(tm)
Heimlich Flutter Valve
One way valve for chest drains from www.freepatentsonline.com
Illustration of Heimlich flutter valve from Netter Medical Illustrations (the blue tubular valve)
Heimlich Valve as part of a pneumothorax kit from Emergency Medical Products
Use of Heimlich Valve from www.freepatentsonline.com
Pulmonology